Housatonic State Forest is a Connecticut state forest occupying  in the towns of Sharon, Canaan, Cornwall, and North Canaan. The state forest includes two Connecticut natural area preserves, Gold’s Pines and Canaan Mountain, and is the only Connecticut state forest that includes a portion of the Appalachian Trail. The forest is open for hiking, hunting, mountain biking, and snowmobiling.

References

External links
Housatonic State Forest Connecticut Department of Energy and Environmental Protection

Connecticut state forests
Parks in Litchfield County, Connecticut
Sharon, Connecticut
Cornwall, Connecticut
North Canaan, Connecticut
Protected areas established in 1927
1927 establishments in Connecticut